Cleo Parker Robinson (born July 17, 1948 in Denver, Colorado) is an American dancer and choreographer. She is most known for being the founder, namesake and executive creative director of the Cleo Parker Robinson Dance Ensemble. She was inducted into the Colorado Women's Hall of Fame in 1989, and named to the National Council on the Arts by President Bill Clinton in 1999. In 2005 she also received a Kennedy Center Medal of Honor during the Center's "Masters of African American Choreographers" series.

Early life
Parker Robinson is the daughter of an African-American actor and a white musician. She faced extreme prejudice while growing up in 1950s Denver. At the age of 10 she nearly died in Dallas when a segregated hospital refused to admit her for a kidney condition quickly enough to prevent heart failure. Doctors expected her to be bedridden the rest of her life. She overcame the condition and threw herself into dancing in order to overcome the pain from the physical condition and emotional challenges of dealing with racism. By age 15 she was already teaching University level dance classes at the University of Colorado. She graduated from Colorado Women's College, now a part of the University of Denver.

Cleo Parker Robinson Dance Ensemble
She is most noted for founding the Cleo Parker Robinson Dance Ensemble in 1970. The ensemble is widely respected and recognized. It has toured internationally, performed at the Lincoln Center and received coverage and positive reviews from the New York Times, Washington Post, and LA Times Representative Mark Udall gave tribute to the ensemble on the floor of the US House of Representatives in 2005 to honor its 35th anniversary.

Notable performers with the ensemble have included Nejla Y. Yatkin, Cornelius Carter, Germaul Barnes and Leni Williams.   They have also worked with costume designer Mary Jane Marcasiano.

One of her more notable artistic creations is "Lush Life," a jazz, poetry and dance collaboration she created together with Maya Angelou.

Awards
Cleo Parker Robinson's awards include:
1974, Colorado Governor's Award for Excellence
1979, Denver Mayor's Award
1989, Inducted into the Colorado Women's Hall of Fame
1991, Honorary Doctorate of Fine Arts, University of Denver
1994, Inducted into the Blacks in Colorado Hall of Fame
2002, Chancellor's Distinguished Professor, University of California, Irvine
2003, Honorary Doctorate of Humane Letters, Colorado College
2005, Kennedy Center Medal of Honor
2007, Legend of Dance in Colorado, University of Denver
2008, Honorary Doctorate of Public Service, Regis University
2008, Civil Rights Award, Anti-Defamation League Western Chapter
2011, Denver & Colorado Tourism Hall of Fame
2017, Dance/USA Honor Award
2021, Honorary Doctor of Humane Letters, University of Colorado at Boulder, "For Extraordinary Contributions to Dance and the Arts Overall"

References

External links
 Official Website of Cleo Parker Robinson Dance

1948 births
Living people
American choreographers